Florence Warner (born March 22, 1947) is an American singer who has worked mainly in recordings of television commercials, including the "Hello News" image campaign from Gari Communications. She was born in Atlanta, Georgia.

Warner appeared on several recordings in the 1970s and early 1980s, including a duet with Demis Roussos on his cover of Air Supply's "Lost in Love" (from the 1980 album, Man of the World). Her recording of the song "Pirate" was selected by Philips for inclusion on the demonstration disc (810 027-2) that came with the first compact disc players, such as the Philips model CD200. In 1984, she sang on the ABC network campaign, "We're With You on ABC" (a campaign using character actors playing the roles of people watching ABC shows throughout the day).

Recordings
 "The Status Cymbal" (1970 with Byron Warner & Tom Porter)
"For No Good Reason" (1973; 7" vinyl single)
"Florence Warner" (1974, vinyl LP)
"Anyway I Love You" (1975, 7" vinyl single)
"Lost in Love" (1980) - duet with Demis Roussos
"Hello Love" (1980, 7" vinyl single)
"Another Hot Night" (1981, vinyl LP)
"Hold Me Once" (1981, 7" vinyl single)
"I Miss Your Heartbeat" (1981, 7" vinyl single)
"Just Believe It" (1982, vinyl LP)
"Once Upon A Time With Me (Theme Song From "Once Upon A Forest")" (1993, 12" single) - duet with The New London Children's Choir 
"Out of the Blue" (1982, 7" vinyl single)
"Once Upon A Time With Me (Once Upon a Forest's 20th Anniversary)" (2013, original version) - duet with Kate Winslet
"Once Upon A Time With Me (Once Upon a Forest's First 25 Years)" (2018, original version) - duet with Wendy Moten

Backing vocals
Jem (1985 - 1988; including the singing voice of Kimber Benton on the song "I'm Okay" with Lani Groves as the singing voice of Stormer)
"Grail: The Rock Musical of the Future" (1999)
Portrait: The Music of Dan Fogelberg From 1972-1997 (1997)
Troubadour The Definitive Collection 1964-1976 - Donovan - (1992)
Gold Expanded Edition: More Collection of Steely Dan Songs - Steely Dan (1982)
Greatest Hits (Dan Fogelberg album) (1982)
Somewhere Over China - Jimmy Buffett (1982)
Bare - Bobby Bare (1978)
Twin Sons of Different Mothers - Dan Fogelberg and Tim Weisberg (1978)
Old - Guy Clark (1975)
7-Tease - Donovan (1974)
Stardancer - Tom Rapp (1972)
Blue River - Eric Andersen (1971)

Television commercials
Burger King
"Hello News" Gari Communications
Hoover
Kmart
Kodak
Michelob
Pepsi
Public Broadcasting (PBS)
Sprite
Safeway
Starburst Fruit Chews
V-8

References

External links
 Florence Warner at IMDb

American women singers
Epic Records artists
1947 births
Living people
Musicians from Atlanta
21st-century American women